Joe Madiath (born 3 December 1950) is an Indian social entrepreneur. He is the founder and former executive director of Gram Vikas, a non-governmental organisation based in Odisha, India. Gram Vikas uses common concerns for water and sanitation to unite and empower rural communities, including adivasi communities.

Childhood and career
Joe Madiath's social activism began at the age of 12, when he helped organise young workers employed by his own father, helping them to fight for better work conditions. As a result, his father sent him away to a boarding school in Kerala. Years later, his father finally accepted his son's views and became supportive of his work as a social entrepreneur.

Madiath studied English literature at the University of Madras, where he was elected the President of the Students' Union of Loyola College, Chennai. There, he founded the Young Students' Movement for Development (YSMD). During this time, he also cycled solo across India, gaining insight into the plight of the poor.

In 1971, Madiath led 400 YSMD volunteers to West Bengal to manage relief camps for refugees from the Bangladesh Liberation War. Witnessing the devastation of the 1971 Odisha cyclone, and realising the comparatively little attention received by the disaster victims, Madiath and a small group of volunteers shifted their attention there. Once their relief efforts were completed, Madiath and a few colleagues from the YSMD decided to stay in Orissa to work as development activists.  On invitation from the district authorities, they moved to Ganjam district in 1976 to begin work with adivasi communities. Madiath founded Gram Vikas in 1979.

Work with Gram Vikas
Since 1979, with Joe Madiath serving as executive director, Gram Vikas has worked mostly with adivasi communities in rural Orissa on a number of development projects, including biogas promotion, community forestry, rural habitat development, and education. The bulk of Gram Vikas' efforts have been on water and sanitation solutions for the rural poor of Orissa.

Gram Vikas uses the "universally important needs of drinking water and sanitation" to bring villagers together and realise how collective action can lead to gains for the community. The fundamentals of Gram Vikas' approach are 100% participation from all villagers, with "clearly defined stakes and mechanisms for institutional and financial sustainability."

Work on water & sanitation

Joe focused on water and sanitation as the entry point in the village development work, partnering with village communities to regenerate thousands of hectares of "wasteland,”eliminating open defecation, significantly reducing waterborne disease incidences, building disaster-proof houses, enabling thousands of women to lead village institutions, educate hundreds of girls, and more. By 2018, Gram Vikas has reached 83,000 households with water and sanitation services mainly in Orissa, but also in Jharkhand, Madhya Pradesh, and Andhra Pradesh

Work on education

Joe Madiath has also founded four tribal residential schools collectively called Gram Vikas Residential School serving the kids of tribal community in remote villages in Ganjam, Gajapati and Kalahandi districts of Odisha. The school caters over 1200 tribal kids and has an active sports program, science and innovation program, arts and design program and also a government funded Atal Tinkering Lab.

Double connection with Nobel Prize 2019 and future plans

Joe Madiath and Gram Vikas have been mentioned in the book Poor Economics by Abhijit Banerjee and Esther Duflo, two of the 2019 Nobel laureates in Economics. They quote him to be a man with a self-deprecating sense of humor who attends the annual meeting of the world's rich and powerful at the World Economic Forum in Davos, Switzerland, in outfits made from homespun cotton.

Gram Vikas has extended its work in other areas such as infrastructure, housing and now energy conservation. And that brings us to its second link with the Nobel Prize in chemistry this year, won by John B. Goodenough (The University of Texas at Austin, USA), M. Stanley Whittingham (Binghamton University, State University of New York, USA) and Akira Yoshino (Asahi Kasei Corporation, Tokyo, Japan and Meijo University, Nagoya, Japan) for developing the Lithium-ion battery.

It is this technology that Madiath is using to implement a massive electrification programme in nine locations throughout the Kalahandi district of Odisha. His team is currently hard at work in the Maligaon village, where a solar micro-grid was set up in 2009, but stopped working within a few years.

Madiath, who has been in touch with the scientists who won this year's Nobel in Chemistry, is on his way to yet another historical first in the country: preserving electricity in a solar grid with lithium-ion batteries.

Awards

Personal recognition                                                                                                                                                                                 

 Asian Development Bank's Water Champion Award
 Schwab Foundation's Outstanding Social Entrepreneur
 Godfrey Phillips Red and White Bravery Award – Social Lifetime Achievement Award (2005)
 Doctor of Divinity, honoris causa – Gurukul Lutheran Theological College
 Lok Samman Award (2009)
 Lifetime Achievement Award for Social Work by Parichay Foundation (2016)

Awarded to Gram Vikas

In the news
Joe Madiath giving TED Talk                     
Article published on Joe's connection with Nobel Prize
Article published on Joe Madiath in World Economic Forum

See also

Gram Vikas

Gram Vikas Residential School

References

External links
 Gram Vikas
 

1950 births
Living people
Indian social entrepreneurs
People from Kottayam district
Businesspeople from Kerala
20th-century Indian businesspeople
20th-century Indian educational theorists